James Forrest (born 16 June 1974) is a New Zealand former cricketer. He played nine first-class and five List A matches for Auckland between 1996 and 1998.

See also
 List of Auckland representative cricketers

References

External links
 

1974 births
Living people
New Zealand cricketers
Auckland cricketers
Cricketers from Auckland